Aagesen (or Aggesen) is a Danish and Norwegian surname. Notable people with the surname include:

Andreas Aagesen (1826–1879), Danish jurist and politician
Astrid Aagesen (1883–1965), Danish-Swedish designer
Fritz Aagesen (1935–1998), Norwegian writer
Karin Ågesen, Danish orienteer
Sven Aggesen (c. 1140 to 1150 – ?), Danish historian
Truid Aagesen (fl. 1593–1625), Danish composer

Danish-language surnames